"A Funky Space Reincarnation" is a 1978 jazz-funk single recorded and released in 1979 by Marvin Gaye on the Tamla label.

In the song, Gaye describes a parallel universe in the future where he is captain of a "space bed" and meets a woman that reminds him of his first wife, Anna. He then tells the woman that they would probably get "married in June" and tells her to "smoke a joint from out of Venus".

The song seems to have been inspired by the likes of funk musicians such as Parliament-Funkadelic and Earth, Wind & Fire. Its musical arrangement is a reprise of his song "Anger", found earlier on the album.

Record World said that "Gaye's characteristic smooth vocals adapt perfectly to this slick funk style with a driving beat and a message in the lyrics."

The song became a modest hit on the R&B charts, where it peaked at No. 23. In the music video he wears a glittering red outfit and is surrounded by a band (presumably his own) and a duo of female dancers. His face is given several close-ups during the video.

Use in popular media 
In 2007 the song was used in the advert for the Dior perfume J'adore starring Charlize Theron.

Singer Musiq Soulchild  sampled the song in his song, "Until", featured on his OnMyRadio album, in 2009.

Personnel
All vocals, keyboards and synthesizers by Marvin Gaye
Produced, written, arranged and composed by Marvin Gaye
Drums by Bugsy Wilcox
Guitar by Gordon Banks
Bass by Frank Blair
Trumpet by Nolan Smith

References

1978 songs
1979 singles
Marvin Gaye songs
Songs written by Marvin Gaye
Song recordings produced by Marvin Gaye
Tamla Records singles